The Definitive Collection is Arista's 1999 Lou Reed collection, complete with an appropriately decadent cover photo by Mick Rock from the mid-1970s.

Track listing
 "The Blue Mask"
 "I Wanna Be Black"
 "Looking for Love"
 "Coney Island Baby"
 "Shooting Star"
 "Romeo Had Juliette"
 "I Want to Boogie With You"
 "Set the Twilight Reeling"
 "Vicious"
 "Street Hassle: A. Waltzing Matilda, B. Street Hassle, C. Slipaway"
 "Vicious Circle"
 "Walk on the Wild Side"
 "Temporary Thing"
 "Cremation/Ashes to Ashes"
 "The Bells"
 "Dirty Blvd." (Live)

References

Lou Reed compilation albums
1999 compilation albums
Arista Records compilation albums